Chondrosteosaurus (meaning "cartilage and bone lizard") was a sauropod dinosaur from Early Cretaceous England.

The type species, Chondrosteosaurus gigas, was described and named by Richard Owen in 1876. The fossils of Chondrosteosaurus were discovered in the Wessex Formation on the Isle of Wight, likely Brighstone or Brook. C. gigas is known only from two neck vertebrae (specimens BMNH 46869, the holotype, and BMNH 46870), with distinctive hollows and internal passages now interpreted as evidence of pneumatic air sacs. Paleontologist Harry Seeley had interpreted similar structures as pneumatic in his specimen of Ornithopsis. Owen disagreed with Seeley's concept of a giant creature bridging the gap between birds or pterosaurs (Owen considered sauropods to be whale-like marine reptiles), and while he acknowledged that the external cavities on the vertebrae may have been connected to the lungs, he interpreted the internal passages as having been filled with cartilage (hence his name for the genus, Chondrosteosaurus or "cartilage and bone lizard").

Owen also named a second species, Chondrosteosaurus magnus, that today no longer is considered to belong to Chondrosteosaurus but instead Ornithopsis.

References

External links 
 Discussion of Chondrosteosaurus with image
 Web page on Chondrosteosaurus

Eusauropoda
Barremian life
Early Cretaceous dinosaurs of Europe
Cretaceous England
Fossils of England
Fossil taxa described in 1876
Taxa named by Richard Owen